Ghulam Dastagir Birajdar was a prominent Indian Muslim pandit and Sanskrit scholar. He was one of a half-dozen Muslim pandits in the country whose understanding of Sanskrit garnered him acclaim. He was well known for his struggle against communalism and promotion of communal harmony.

References

Sanskrit grammarians
Indian Sanskrit scholars